Der kleine Ritter Trenk (English: The little Knight Trenk) is a German television series.

Characters
Trenk Tausendschlag (voiced by Can Schneider in the German version) - A brave and courageous nine-year-old peasant boy who left his home to earn his fortune so he can save his family from the unjust rule of Sir Wertholt.  He soon gets an opportunity to train under and kindly knight named Sir Hans as a page and become a knight himself.  However to do this he has to keep is identity as a peasant boy a secret.
Thekla (voiced by Imogen Burrell in the German version) - A fun-loving and adventurous castle maiden and daughter of Sir Hans who is about Trenk's age.  An ace with a pea-shooting slingshot, Thekla's dream is to become a knight herself rather than the typical activities of a maiden.  So when she meets Trenk and sees he's not really her cousin she keeps the secret, but in exchange she convinces him to teach her everything he learns.
Piggeldy (German: Ferkelchen) - Trenk and his family's young piglet and companion.
Sir Hans (voiced by Hartmut Neugebauer in the German version) - The kindly knight and lord of Castle Hohenlob and the surrounding land and father of Thekla.
Momme Mumm (voiced by Domenic Redl in the German version) - A traveling trickster and juggler whom Trenk befriends on his first outing.  He and his troupe often help Trenk and Thekla whenever they're in a tight spot.
Sir Wertholt (voiced by Ekkehardt Belle in the German version) - An evil and unjust knight who oppresses both his men and his serfs including Trenk and his family.
Mattes and Veit (voiced by Dirk Galuba and Tobias Lelle respectively in the German version) - Two of Sir Wertholt's followers who often do grunt work for the knight.
Linhard (voiced by Patrick Roche in the German version) - A twelve-year-old page under Sir Wertholt and a rival to Trenk.
Haug and Martha Tausendschlag - Trenk's father and mother.
Mia Mina Tausendschlag - Trenk's little sister.
Sir Dietz - A knight from Castle Durgelstein who is also Sir Hans' brother-in-law and father of Zink.  When he meets Trenk, he offers to allow Trenk and Zink switch places so that Trenk can receive training with Sir Hans instead.
Zink (voiced by Jacob Hofmann in the German version) - Sir Dietz' somewhat cowardly son who does not want to be a knight like his father.  When he and Trenk meet, the two switch places so that Trenk can receive training in his place.
Chaplain (German: Kaplan; voiced by Philipp Rafferty in the German version) - The priest at Castle Hohenlob and teacher to Trenk and Thekla.
Dorothea (voiced by Lili Zahavi in the German version) - The young daughter of the prince.

Episode list

Season 1 (2011)
Thirteen Episodes

Season 2 (2012)
Thirteen episodes

2015 film
There is also a 2015 film.

References

External links
 

2011 German television series debuts
2012 German television series endings
German children's animated adventure television series
German-language television shows
Television series set in the Middle Ages